The 2018 FFAS Senior League is the 38th edition of the FFAS Senior League, the top football league of American Samoa organized by the Football Federation American Samoa. This season is competed by 12 teams and started on 15 September 2018. The competition was won by Pago Youth.

Teams
These are the teams for the 2018 season.
Black Roses
Green Bay
Ilaoa and To'omata
Lion Heart
Pago Youth FC
Pago Youth B
PanSa
Royal Puma
Tafuna Jets
Taputimu Youth
Utulei Youth
Vaiala Tongan

Regular season

FFAS League Finals

Semi finals

Third place play-off

Final

Winner qualifies for 2020 OFC Champions League qualifying stage.

References

External links
2018 FFAS Men's National League

FFAS Senior League seasons
American Samoa
football